Prabhdeep Singh, better known by his stage name, Prabh Deep, is an Indian rapper, songwriter and music producer. He gained recognition in the Indian music industry after the release of his debut album Class-Sikh which debuted at number 2 on iTunes India albums chart and quickly ranked up to number 1 by the end of the year.

Early life
Prabh Deep was born in the West Delhi suburb of Tilak Nagar to Jaswinder Kaur, a small-scale businesswoman, and Manmohan Singh. His father had lost his father and four brothers during a killing spree by angry mobs during the 1984 riots in Nangloi Jat Manmohan struggled with the post-traumatic stress of the riots and developed addictions. The family was, therefore, supported by the earnings through the hair salon run by Prabh Deep's mother.

Prabh Deep decided to drop out of high school right before his 12th standard board examination on account of the pointlessness of the Indian education system. His mother supported his decision to quit school to build his own path in music.

The increasing financial troubles of the family, as well as bullying in school, eventually got him involved in a street gang, partaking in streetfights, petty jobs such as selling second-hand phones and motorbikes at a mark-up and acting as a middleman for money lenders. Later on, he also had a short stint as a salesman at a garment shop and as a call centre executive for three years before pursuing a full-time career in music.

Career
Around the summer of 2008, Prabh Deep and his childhood friend Happu witnessed a dance crew performing stunts in a park. Impressed by the urban dance form, he and Happu joined a hip-hop dance group in the neighbouring area of Vikaspuri and spent the next few years practising b-boying. While continuing his jobs as a call centre executive and salesman, Prabh Deep maintained close contact with the Delhi hip-hop circuit while undergoing a slow transition from a dancer to an emcee.

Through rapper Zan Twoshadez and hip-hop culture researcher Jaspal Singh, Prabh Deep was introduced to the open mic nights and similar events in Delhi that laid the foundation of his rapping career. In 2015, Prabh Deep connected with indie music producer Sez on the Beat on Facebook and began co-producing music. Sez signed him to the indie record Azadi Records. The entire debut album of Class-Sikh was produced in Sez's home studio.

Prabh Deep marked his entry in Bollywood with his song Sherni for Anurag Kashyap's 2018 drama Manmarziyaan. He also wrote and performed the song Toofan Main for the original soundtrack of Amazon Prime crime series Paatal Lok.

In 2019, Prabh Deep released his self-produced EP, K I N G. 2021 marked the release of his sophomore album, Tabia. This became the first Indian hip hop album to be reviewed by Pitchfork. In 2022, he released his third album, Bhram.

Artistry

Influences
Prabh Deep cites Eminem and Dr. Dre as his idols.

Themes and genres
Prabh Deep is described as an innovative lyricist whose music has socially conscious origins. Throughout his album Class-Sikh, his music revolved around the hidden, grimy underbelly scenery of suburbs of Delhi. For his album Class-Sikh, he picked up various bits and pieces from his personal experiences including the story of his childhood friend Abu's fall into drug addiction, crime and eventually murder. His music is described as slang-inflected with bits of Punjabi, Hindi and English. His song Suno narrates the complex and unfortunate education system of India that leads to suicides and drug overdoses by the youth in India. He also discussed issues like 2019–2021 Jammu and Kashmir lockdown in Elaan, violence-instigating politics by the governments of global superpowers including the US and India in King and the violence and brutalities of the hidden underbelly of Delhi in Toofan Main. Amar is an introspective track, with him talking about preparing for death and his soul's immortality through his art. Chitta revolves around a character representing Prabh Deep himself, and his interactions in a world ruled by the corrupt, the wealthy and the powerful; as well as the deep-rooted problems in India's neighbourhoods. His album Tabia explores the themes of self discovery, spiritual awakening, pride and humility.

Discography

Film music

Albums and EPs

Singles and collaborations

References

External links

Living people
1993 births
Indian singers
Punjabi-language lyricists
Indian singer-songwriters